Scopula quadrifasciata is a moth of the  family Geometridae. It is found in Angola, Kenya, Nigeria, South Africa, Tanzania, Uganda, Zambia and Zimbabwe.

References

Moths described in 1909
quadrifasciata
Moths of Africa